Sydelle Noel (born July 16, 1985) is an American actress and former athlete, best known for her role as Cherry "Junkchain" Bang in GLOW.

Early life
Noel was born in Hollywood, Florida. She studied at the University of Georgia on a track scholarship. Her professional running career lasted for several years, but ended due to a stress fracture.

Career
Noel moved into sports modeling, moving to California in 2004, before starting acting.

Filmography

Television

Film

References

External links

1985 births
Living people
American film actresses
African-American actresses
American television actresses
Noel, Sydelle
University of Georgia alumni
21st-century American actresses
21st-century African-American women
20th-century African-American people
20th-century African-American women